The 2015 Remus F3 Cup was the 34th Austria Formula 3 Cup season and the third Remus F3 Cup season.

Jordi Weckx of Rennsport Rössler was crowned champion by one point over Performance Racing driver Akash Nandy, who missed the last round. Jörg Sandek became the Trophy class champion for the third time.

Teams and drivers
All Cup cars were built between 2005 and 2011, while Trophy cars were built between 1992 and 2004.

Numbers used at Remus F3 Cup events listed; numbers used at races run to F2 Italian Trophy regulations displayed in tooltips.

Calendar & Race results

Round 1 and 7 (Monza and Brno) were held together with the F2 Italian Trophy. However, no Italian F2 Trophy competitors were eligible to score Remus F3 Cup points.

Championship standings

Cup

Trophy

Notes

References

External links
Website of the AFR Cups [German]

Austria Formula 3 Cup
Remus
Remus F3 Cup